"Animals" is the debut single taken from Sparkadia's debut album Postcards. The single was released digitally in the UK and in Australia. The single brought recognition to the band and made it onto the Triple J's Hottest 100 playlist of 2007.

Track list
The single was digitally released.

Chart positions
The single was not eligible to chart in either UK or Australia. Although the single was on high rotation on Australian radio program 'Triple J'.

Music video
The music video appears to be a high budget shot video. It is partly animated and features
the band performing with mystique backgrounds.

References

2007 singles
2007 songs
Song recordings produced by Ben Hillier
Ivy League Records singles